Leitha may refer to:

 The Leitha River
 Leitha-Banat
 Bruck an der Leitha
 Bruck an der Leitha District
 Götzendorf an der Leitha
 Neufeld an der Leitha
 Leithaprodersdorf
 Trautmannsdorf an der Leitha
 Wimpassing an der Leitha
 Leithagebirge
 Hof am Leithagebirge
 Mannersdorf am Leithagebirge
 Sankt Georgen am Leithagebirge

See also 
 Lajtha (disambiguation)